is a Japanese rower. He competed in the men's eight event at the 1988 Summer Olympics.

References

External links
 
 

1963 births
Living people
Japanese male rowers
Olympic rowers of Japan
Rowers at the 1988 Summer Olympics
Place of birth missing (living people)
Asian Games medalists in rowing
Rowers at the 1986 Asian Games
Asian Games bronze medalists for Japan
Medalists at the 1986 Asian Games